Daniel Lena (born 17 August 1999), known professionally as Unknown T, is a British rapper. His post release album Rise Above Hate (2020) was a major hit on the UK music scene, the album reaching the top of the charts in its first couple of weeks.

Career 
Unknown T was born in London to Ugandan parents. His debut single, "Homerton B", peaked at number 48 on the UK Singles Chart in October 2018. Though it was originally released without a label, its chart performance led to him being signed by Island Records through Universal Music Group and appeared at Wireless festival in 2019. It was included in a number of publications "best of 2018" lists, including The Guardian, Mixmag, and Complex. In March 2019, "Homerton B" became the first UK drill track to be certified Silver by the BPI. Follow up tracks "Throwback", "Meat" and "Leave Dat Trap", the latter featuring AJ Tracey, have accumulated over 5 million views.

Unknown T's first mixtape Rise Above Hate was released on 17 July 2020 and peaked at 14 on the UK Albums Chart. On 7 January 2021, Unknown T released the single "WW2". On 10 June, the second single "Wonderland" featuring M Huncho was released. On 25 June, he released the third single "Goodums". On 15 July, he released the fourth single "Driller sh!t". On 30 July 2021, Unknown T released his second mixtape Adolescence, including guest appearances from Digga D, M1llionz, Potter Payper, and Nafe Smallz.

Personal life 
Lena is a supporter of Liverpool F.C.

Legal issues 
In 2017, aged 17, Lena was cleared of hiding a 4 mm revolver and ammunition under his bed after claiming the gun was foisted upon him by a stranger. More recently Lena was cleared of murdering Steve Narvaez-Jara, 20, at a house party near Old Street, Islington, London in the early hours of 1 January 2018. Speaking to the Guardian in 2018, Lena complained that the drill scene – long the subject of criticism in the media – was being unfairly attacked. "They don't understand the reality," he said. "It's not about the music, it's about what's behind the music. You can't blame the music, or say you're giving a helping hand with no aid. They're pointing the finger at us but forgetting there's three fingers pointing back."

Discography

Mixtapes

Compilation albums

Singles

As lead artist

As featured artist

Guest appearances

References 

People from the London Borough of Hackney
Black British male rappers
Rappers from London
UK drill musicians
Gangsta rappers
Living people
English male rappers
1999 births
English people of Ugandan descent